is a Japanese award for the most searched products, media and people during the year.

Overview 
Each year, Yahoo! Japan recognizes celebrities and businesses in various award categories for achieving significant search volumes for related keywords. The successful keywords in each category show the significant social impact of search terms and the reciprocal nature of what people search for online and what they're interested in offline. There are multiple award categories in three major categories (Person, Culture, and Product), and the most searched for item in the Person category is selected for the Grand Prize.

In addition to those listed below, a local category was established in the 3rd edition (2016) to select the fastest-rising search terms related to the area by users in each of the 47 prefectures. From the 8th edition (2021), the product and local categories were abolished and reduced to only the person and culture categories.

Award winners

2014 Awards 
Announced on December 8, 2014.

 Grand Prize : Yuzuru Hanyu
 Person category
 Actor category: Ebizo Ichikawa
 Actress category: Satomi Ishihara
 Owarai Tarento Division: Nippon Elekitel Rengo
 Athletes Division: Yuzuru Hanyu
 Special category: HIKAKIN
 Model category: Miwako Kakei
 Musician Division: SEKAI NO OWARI
 Idol category: Kanna Hashimoto ( Rev. from DVL )
 Culture category
 Drama section: Hanako and Anne
 Novel Division: Roosevelt Game
 Game Division: Monster Strike
 Film Division: Frozen
 Anime section: Yo-Kai Watch
 Product category
 Cosmetics category: Lunasol Eyeshadow ( Kanebo Cosmetics )
 Car division: Hustler ( Suzuki )
 Home Appliances: Raycop (Raycop Japan)
 Back-order department: Mochi Yakumo (Chimoto, a sweets shop)
 Beverage sector: Almond effect ( Glico )

2015 Awards 
Announced on December 9, 2015.

 Grand Prize : Sandaime J Soul Brothers from EXILE TRIBE
 Person category
 Actor category: Masataka Kubota
 Actress category: Suzu Hirose
 Owarai Tarento Division: 8.6 seconds Bazooka
 Athletes Division: Goromaru Ayumu
 Model Division: Nicole Fujita
 Musician Division: Sandaime J Soul Brothers from EXILE TRIBE
 Idol category: Hey! Say! JUMP
 Writer category: Naoki Matayoshi
 Voice actor category: Tomoko Kaneda
 Culture category
 Drama category: Rare
 Novel section: Sparks
 Game Division: Monster Strike
 Film Division: Jurassic World
 Anime section: Assassination Classroom
 Product category
 Cosmetics category: Yves Saint Laurent Lipstick (Yves Saint Laurent)
 Car division: S660 ( Honda )
 Home Appliances Division: Dyson Vacuum Cleaner (Dyson)
 Back-order department: Freshly made potato chips (Kikusudo)
 Beverage category: Sokenbicha ( Coca-Cola Japan )
 Sweets category: Seven Cafe Donuts ( Seven-Eleven )

2016 Awards 
Announced on December 7, 2016.

 Grand Prize : Dean Fujioka
 Person category
 Actor category: Dean Fujioka
 Actress category: Mitsuki Takahata
 Owarai Tarento Division: Kazureza ( Maple Super Alloy )
 Athletes Division: Ai Fukuhara
 Model division: ryuchell
 Musician Division: Sakura Fujiwara
 Idol category: Sakurazaka46
 Writer category: Sayaka Murata
 Voice actor category: Yuichi Nakamura
 Culture category
 Drama section: Sanada Maru
 Novel section: I want to eat your pancreas
 Game Division: Pokémon GO
 Movie Division: Your name.
 Buzzwords category: PPAP
 Special category: Table tennis
 Product category
 Cosmetics category: Marriage Lip ( Estee Lauder )
 Car division: Estima ( Toyota )
 Home Appliances Division: PlayStation VR ( Sony Interactive Entertainment )
 Back-order department: Menchi-katsu (Kakunoshin)
 Beverages: Mets ( Kirin Beverage )
 Sweets category: Happy pancakes
 Food Division: Super Barley Granola

2017 Awards 
Announced on December 6, 2017.

 Grand Prize : Chiemi Blouson
 Person category
 Actor category: Issei Takahashi
 Actress category: Riho Yoshioka
 Owarai Tarento Division: Chiemi Blouson
 Athletes Division: Anne Cine
 Model category: Rika Izumi
 Musician Division: Namie Amuro
 Idol category: Sakurazaka46
 Writer category: Kazuo Ishiguro
 Voice actor section: Junichi Suwabe
 Special category (male): Souta Fujii
 Special category (female): Mei Nagano
 Culture category
 Anime section: Kemono Friends
 Movie Division: Beauty and the Beast
 Game Division: Dragon Quest XI In search of the passing time
 Novel section: My husband's dick does not fit
 Drama Division: Code Blue -Doctor Heli Emergency Lifesaving-
 Buzzword category: Sontaku
 Product category
 Beverage category: Sokenbicha ( Coca-Cola Japan )
 Back- order department: LeTAO 　cheesecake
 Home Appliances Division : Nintendo Switch
 Car Division: Harrier (Toyota)
 Cosmetics category: OPERA Lip Tint
 Food department: Nogami "raw" bread
 Sweets category: Jiichiro's Baumkuchen

2018 Awards 
Announced on December 5, 2018

 Grand Prize : King & Prince
 Person category
 Actor category: Tomoya Nakamura
 Actress category: Mio Imada
 Owarai Tarento Division: Hyokkorihan
 Athletes Division: Yuzuru Hanyu
 Model division: Kōki,
 Musician Division: Namie Amuro
 Idol category: King & Prince
 Voice actor category: Yumiko Kobayashi
 Writer category: Taro Yabe ( Karateka )
 Special category (male): Yuzuru Hanyu
 Special category (female): Naomi Osaka
 Culture category
 Anime Division: Pop Team Epic
 Film Division: The Greatest Showman
 Game Division: Monster Hunter: World
 Novel section: My husband's dick does not fit
 Drama category: Half blue.
 Buzzwords section: Ohsako is odd
 Product category
 Beverages: Ayataka (Coca-Cola Japan)
 Back-order department: LeTAO cheesecake
 Home Appliances: iPhone 8 ( Apple )
 Car Division: Jimny (Suzuki)
 Cosmetics category: Opera Lip Tint
 Food department: Nogami "raw" bread
 Sweets category: Red silo ( Seigetsu )

2019 Awards 
Announced on December 4, 2019. Of the originally planned categories, the person category special category award and the product category order category award were not announced due to the request of the winners.

 Grand Prize : Ryusei Yokohama
 Person category
 Actor category: Ryusei Yokohama
 Actress category: Yu Aoi
 Owarai Tarento Division: Ringo-chan
 Athletes Division: Hinako Shibuno
 Model category: Yuki Poyo
 Musician Division: Aimyon
 Idol category: Hinatazaka46
 Voice actor category: Yuki Kaji
 Writer category: Eiichiro Oda
 Culture category
 Anime Division: Demon Slayer: Kimetsu no Yaiba
 Movie Division: Weathering with You
 Game Division: Dragon Quest Walk
 Novel section: The Twelve Kingdoms
 Drama Division: It's your turn
 Buzzwords category: Reiwa
 Product category
 Beverages: Gong Cha Tapioca Milk Tea
 Home Appliances Division: IQOS ( Philip Morris Japan )
 Car division: RAV4 (Toyota)
 Cosmetics category: BOTANIST Botanical cleansing
 Food department: Nogami "raw" bread
 Sweets Division: Lawson Baschi

2020 Awards 
Announced on December 9, 2020.

 Grand Prize : Takeru Sato
 Person category
 Actor category: Takeru Sato
 Actress category: Mone Kamishiraishi
 Owarai Tarento Division: Fuwa-chan
 Athletes Division: Mikuru Asakura
 Model section: Suzu Yamanouchi
 Musician Division: Official Hige Dandism
 Idol category: NiziU
 Voice actor category: Natsuki Hanae
 Writer category: Hitonari Tsuji
 Special category: Souta Fujii
 Culture category
 Anime Division: Demon Slayer: Kimetsu no Yaiba
 Movie section: Demon Slayer: Kimetsu no Yaiba – The Movie: Mugen Train
 Game Division: Animal Crossing: New Horizons ( Nintendo )
 Novel section: The Plague ( Albert Camus )
 Drama section: Naoki Hanzawa
 Buzzwords category: Zoom
 Product category
 Beverages: Discerning Lemon Sour Lemon Hall ( Coca-Cola Japan )
 Home Appliances Division: Nintendo Switch
 Car Division: Yaris Cross ( Toyota )
 Cosmetics Division: V3 Foundation
 Food sector: Neko Neko bread
 Sweets category: misdo meets PIERRE HERME

References

External links 
Official website

Japanese awards
Web awards